This is a list of chickpea dishes and foods that use chickpeas (also known as garbanzo beans) or chickpea flour (gram flour) as a primary ingredient.

Chickpea dishes

 
 
 
  
 s
 
 
 
 
 Burmese tofu – includes chickpea flour in its preparation
 
 
 
 
 
 
 
 
 
 
 
 
 
 
 Guasanas – a dish from Mexico consisting of chickpeas, water and salt. The chickpeas are steamed and shelled before serving.
 Hummus
 
  – Algerian chickpea flan
 
 
 
 
 
 
 
 
 s
 Panelle - Fried Italian chickpea fritters, common street food in Sicily.
 Panisse - Smaller and thicker sort of socca from Marseille to Nice
 s
 
 Pitaroudia — chickpea fritters or dumplings, in Greek cuisine
 
 Revithada — dish, in Greek cuisine, that involves baked chickpeas
 Revithia — chickpea soup, in Greek cuisine

See also
 List of legume dishes
 Lists of prepared foods

Further reading

Chickpea dishes
Faboideae
Chickpea